Strongylognathus minutus is a species of ant in the genus Strongylognathus. It is endemic to Turkmenistan.

References

Insects of Central Asia
Strongylognathus
Hymenoptera of Asia
Endemic fauna of Turkmenistan
Insects described in 1991
Taxonomy articles created by Polbot